The Circumcision  is an oil on canvas painting of the Circumcision of Jesus by Peter Paul Rubens, produced in 1605 during his stay in Rome. It is now in the Chiesa del Gesù e dei Santi Ambrogio e Andrea church in Genoa.

It was commissioned by Marcello Pallavicino, vestryman of the Casa Professa of Jesuits in Genoa. It is mainly influenced by Mantuan paintings from the court of Vincenzo Gonzaga, with a strongly foreshortened viewpoint.

There is another version of the subject by the artist, in the Academy of Fine Arts Vienna.

References

Bibliography
G. Bertelli, G. Briganti, A. Giuliano, Storia dell'Arte Italiana, vol. 3, p. 299, Roma 2009, Edizioni Scolastiche Bruno Mondadori

1605 paintings
Paintings by Peter Paul Rubens
Paintings of the Circumcision of Christ
Angels in art
Paintings in Genoa